Mebane is a surname. Notable people with the surname include: 

Alexander Mebane, (1744-1795), U.S. Congressman from North Carolina
Brandon Mebane (born 1985), American football player
Giles Mebane (1809–1899), American politician from North Carolina
Lily Morehead Mebane (1869-1943), American relief worker during World War I 
Walter Mebane (born 1958), American political scientist

English-language surnames